= Oxycodegol =

Names
- IUPAC name (4R,4aS,7S,7aR,12bS)-9-methoxy-7-[2-[2-[2-[2-[2-(2-methoxyethoxy)ethoxy]ethoxy]ethoxy]ethoxy]ethoxy]-3-methyl-1,2,4,5,6,7,7a,13-octahydro-4,12-methanobenzofuro[3,2-e]isoquinolin-4a-ol
- Other names Oxicodegol; Loxicodegol; NKTR-181

Identifiers
CAS Number	1211231-76-3
3D model (JSmol)	Interactive image
ChemSpider	64854462
DrugBank	DB14146
IUPHAR/BPS	10652
KEGG	D11424
PubChem CID	73673720
UNII	J2WIV0JMML
- InChI: InChI=1S/C31H49NO10/c1-32-9-8-30-27-23-4-5-24(35-3)28(27)42-29(30)25(6-7-31(30,33)26(32)22-23)41-21-20-40-19-18-39-17-16-38-15-14-37-13-12-36-11-10-34-2/h4-5,25-26,29,33H,6-22H2,1-3H3/t25-,26+,29-,30-,31+/m0/s1 Key: RQHILGKAOIGUHU-XPLSERNMSA-N
- SMILES: CN1CC[C@]23[C@@H]4[C@H](CC[C@]2([C@H]1CC5=C3C(=C(C=C5)OC)O4)O)OCCOCCOCCOCCOCCOCCOC

Properties
Chemical formula	C_{31}H_{49}NO_{10}
Molar mass	595.730 g·mol^{−1}
- Except where otherwise noted, data are given for materials in their standard state (at 25 °C [77 °F], 100 kPa). Infobox references

Oxycodegol (also known as loxicodegol and NKTR-181) is an experimental μ-opioid receptor agonist for the treatment of pain. It has had success for back pain as an alternative to traditional opioids, which have potential for abuse. It acts more slowly on the central nervous system, reducing risk for abuse and respiratory depression.
